The 1999 Lunar New Year Cup (also known as Carlsberg Cup) was a football tournament held in Hong Kong over the first and fourth day of the Chinese New Year holiday (17 January and 20 January 1999).

Participating teams
  Bulgaria
  Hong Kong League XI (host)
  Mexico
  Egypt

Results
All times given in Hong Kong Time (UTC+8).

Semifinals

Third place match

Final

Bracket

Scorers
3 goals
  Hristo Yovov
 2 goals
  Hossam Hassan
1 goal
  Luis Hernández
  Jose Abundis
  Rafael Márquez
  Hristo Stoichkov
  Hazem Imam

See also
Hong Kong Football Association
Hong Kong First Division League

References
 

1999
1998–99 in Hong Kong football
1998–99 in Bulgarian football
1998–99 in Mexican football
1998–99 in Egyptian football